The Tyburn Railroad  is a short-line railroad in Morrisville, Bucks County, Pennsylvania owned by Regional Rail, LLC. The railroad operates  of track, serving a rail to truck transload facility. It interchanges with CSX Transportation and Norfolk Southern Railway in Fairless. The Tyburn Railroad was acquired by Regional Rail, LLC in September 2011.

References

External links

Official website

Pennsylvania railroads
Railway companies established in 2007
Switching and terminal railroads